Chen Ting-Yang (born 28 September 1992) is a Taiwanese footballer who currently plays as a midfielder or a defender for Taiwan Football Premier League club Taichung Futuro.

International career

International goals
Scores and results list Chinese Taipei's goal tally first.

Honours

Club
Lee Man
Hong Kong Sapling Cup: 2018–19

References

External links
 

1992 births
Living people
Taiwanese footballers
Taiwanese expatriate footballers
Chinese Taipei international footballers
Hong Kong Premier League players
Taiwan Football Premier League players
Lee Man FC players
Taichung Futuro F.C. players
Taiwanese expatriates in Hong Kong
People from Hualien County
Association football midfielders
Association football defenders
Footballers at the 2018 Asian Games
Asian Games competitors for Chinese Taipei